A list of notable Polish mathematicians:

References

 
Mathematicians
Polish